Gabriel Nicolás Benegas (born 1 March 1996) is an Argentine professional footballer who currently plays for Defensores de Belgrano in the Primera Nacional.

Career
Benegas played for Vicov and Boca Juniors in his youth career. He first played for Boca's senior squad during the 2016 Argentine Primera División season, making his debut in a defeat to Argentinos Juniors. He subsequently participated in Boca's final three fixtures of the season.

In July 2016, Benegas joined fellow Primera División outfit Quilmes on loan. His Quilmes debut came on 10 September against Huracán. In his third appearance, Benegas scored his first career goal versus Olimpo.

In August 2017, Benegas was loaned out to Primera B Nacional team San Martín. Almost a year later, Brown signed Benegas.

After five goals in twenty-seven matches for Brown, Benegas moved across the second tier to Defensores de Belgrano. He scored five times in the curtailed 2019–20, including twice against former club Quilmes.

On 18 February 2021, Benegas headed to South Korea to join K League 2 side Seoul E-Land FC; penning terms until 2023. There was also an offer from an unnamed Spanish club, though he chose the Korean team out of sincerity. He debuted on 28 February in a win against Busan IPark, coming off the bench to replace Lee Geon-hui. He then netted twice on his second appearance against Gimcheon Sangmu on 6 March. After a spell at Paraguayan club Sol de América in early 2022, Benegas returned to his former club, Defensores de Belgrano, on 3 June 2022.

Career statistics
.

References

External links

1996 births
Living people
Argentine footballers
Argentine expatriate footballers
Sportspeople from Misiones Province
Association football forwards
Argentine Primera División players
Primera Nacional players
K League 2 players
Paraguayan Primera División players
Boca Juniors footballers
Quilmes Atlético Club footballers
San Martín de Tucumán footballers
Club Atlético Brown footballers
Defensores de Belgrano footballers
Seoul E-Land FC players
Club Sol de América footballers
Expatriate footballers in South Korea
Expatriate footballers in Paraguay
Argentine expatriate sportspeople in South Korea
Argentine expatriate sportspeople in Paraguay